Post-transaction marketing is a deceptive marketing practice used by many companies, which have then been subject to investigation, charges from state attorneys general, and class action lawsuits.

According to a United States Senate staff report, this practice presents "highly aggressive sales tactics [which] charge millions of American consumers for services the consumers do not want and do not understand they have purchased." It reports that consumers involuntarily spent $1.4 billion USD due to these practices, US$792 million of that paid to the third-party sites which presented services paid for by post-transaction marketing.  The report  concluded that such marketing practices "exploit consumers' expectations about the online 'checkout' process." It stated that their "Misleading 'Yes' and 'Continue' buttons cause consumers to reasonably think they are completing the original transaction, rather than entering into a new, ongoing financial relationship with a membership club."

Mechanics of the practice
The Senate report identified "data pass", or the automatic transfer from the merchant after the transaction of the customer's credit card information. Information provided by the Federal Trade Commission and the National Association of Attorneys General, and information collected from telephone billing has found that requiring the entry of credit card information will decrease the likelihood that a customer will enter a transaction by a factor of 3 or 4. Therefore, companies will use the automatic transference of this information which will induce consumers to involuntarily provide their credit card information to merchants which they were otherwise unwilling to transact with.

It also reported that post-transaction marketers will pay a US$10 to US$30 "bounty" for a customer's enrollment in a membership club. The report also identified low consumer awareness of their involuntary memberships to these clubs, and cites numerous consumer complaints. It also presents companies' training scripts for customer service staff response to such complaints, especially those from individuals unaware of their enrollment. It also identifies high cancellation rates as evidence that these subscriptions were unwanted.

In addition, it identified unscrupulous efforts to protect merchants against legitimate consumer complaints by labeling it as a "strict no-no" to refer customers to the providers of the services which they were involuntarily enrolled in, and quotes a variety of complaints from merchants who were concerned about these deceptive practices.

Participating companies
Senator Rockefeller held a hearing regarding aggressive sales tactics used by companies.

Hundreds of popular companies, most notably Intelius, will, in an effort to increase the profit of the transaction, provide something to the consumer immediately after the purchase on the site. Consumers are typically provided with cash back for simply pressing a confirmation button. However, when they do, their credit card information is automatically submitted to a third-party marketing company, which signs the customer up for a package of useless services. These practices have been utilized by major companies, including 1-800-Flowers.com, Buy.com, Classmates.com, ColumbiaHouse, Confi-Check, Expedia, FTD, Fandango, Hotels.com, Hotwire, InQ, Intelius, MovieTickets.com, Orbitz, Priceline, RedcatsUSA, Shutterfly, Travelocity, US Airways, and VistaPrint, profiting at over US$10 million each. Classmates.com profited greater than US$70 million.

The three largest companies engaging in these practices are Affinion, Vertrue and Webloyalty. The report notes that these three companies have profited greater than US$1.4 billion. There are currently 4 million people enrolled in these plans. 450 or more e-commerce sites have joined the fraud, said the report, 88 of which have received at least US$1 million. The websites can earn up to US$2,600 per thousand visitors, with a conversion rate up to 4.5%.

It was noted that these scams have significant similarities to the Scamville social gaming fraud. The companies which do not engage in these tactics, such as Scamville, are at a disadvantage. They earn less income, which means that advertising costs could overpower profits. Therefore, companies are forced into the practice, or out of business.

A Supplemental Staff Report released in May 2010 starts the exploration of efforts by post-transaction marketers to avoid refunds. One of these efforts is using scripts, which are in place in order to minimize the amount returned to consumers and refused to refund, unless the consumer specifically demands a refund. Another practice is to deliberately avoid informing consumers that they have multiple memberships, even when they call to report one such membership.

References

Additional sources
 Classmates.com tied to more dubious marketing tactics | Media Maverick - CNET News
 Visa targets online marketing 'scam' | Media Maverick - CNET News
 Intelius and the Dubious Art of "Post-Transaction Marketing" - Page 1 - News - Seattle - Seattle Weekly
 Affinion stops buying credit-card info from e-tailers | Media Maverick - CNET News

Marketing techniques
Consumer fraud